Akbarpur Khurd village comes under the Nakodar tehsil of Jalandhar. Jalandhar is a district in the Indian state of Punjab. The village lies on the Shahkot-Mehatpur road. The nearest railway station to Akbarpur Khurd is Nakodar Railway station 13 km from it.  Akbarpur Khurd's post office is Akbarpur Kalan whose PIN is 144041.

References 

Villages in Jalandhar district
Villages in Nakodar tehsil